Saremar (Sardegna Regionale Marittima) was an Italian shipping company, a subdivision of state-owned Tirrenia di Navigazione until 2009, when it was transferred to the Sardinian regional government. It operated in routes from Sardinia to La Maddelena and San Pietro islands, Bonifacio in Corsica, Savona and Civitavecchia in Mainland Italy.

Fleet

Routes

domestic
Palau↔La Maddalena
Portovesme↔Carloforte
Calasetta↔Carloforte

Sardinia ↔ Corsica
Santa Teresa di Gallura↔Bonifacio

Sardinia ↔ mainland
Olbia ↔ Civitavecchia 
Porto Torres ↔ Savona Vado

External links
 Official website

Shipping companies of Italy
Ferry companies of Italy
Transport in Sardinia
Tirrenia Compagnia Italiana di Navigazione